This list of the tallest buildings and structures in Salford ranks buildings in the city and metropolitan borough of Salford by height.

Salford is part of the Greater Manchester metropolitan county which has 27 towers either built or under construction over 100 metres, the highest number of towers in any metropolitan area in the United Kingdom outside Greater London.


History and future development
At , Salford Cathedral was the tallest building in Salford for 118 years following its construction in 1848. However it was not until the 1960s and 1970s that the first tall building boom in Salford occurred. During this period a number of mid-rise brutalist residential buildings were constructed, predominantly in the Pendleton area of the city as a means to house significant populations affected by industrial decline. In 1966, the  City Central tower finally overtook Salford Cathedral as the tallest building in the city.

Through the 1980s and 1990s, few significant proposals came to fruition. However, there has been a renewed interest in skyscrapers in Salford in the past two decades with a number of proposals being brought forward. Significant proposals included the   Greengate Tower and the  Canopus Tower A, both in the Greengate area of the city, which would have been the tallest towers in Salford and the city's first official skyscrapers if built. However due to economic factors in 2008 these towers were never constructed.

Unlike most major cities in the United Kingdom, there are no height restrictions and local planning officers generally adopt a laissez-faire attitude towards city centre high rises in Salford. Media City in the Salford Quays area of the city has been at the forefront of development in the last 10 years with a number of mid-rise towers being completed. These include the  Blue, MediaCityUK which became the tallest building in the city in 2010, the X1 Media City collection of four 85 m (277 ft) towers and the  TheHeart, MediaCity UK.

Into the 2020s, Salford Quays will continue to be an important growth district for Salford with two further tower cluster emerging in Cotton Quay and in the second phase of the X1 development in MediaCityUK. The Cotton Quay development will see a collection of six towers over  constructed including the  Tower One which will become the second-tallest building in Salford when completed.

The Greengate area of Salford is the second major development area for the city. Its location close to Central Manchester and relative underdevelopment over the preceding decades means that a number of significant new proposals have come forward. In 2018, the  Anaconda Cut became the tallest building in the city and the first building in Salford to reach a height of over 100 metres.

If all future plans come to fruition, then Greengate will feature two skyscrapers over 150 metres and a further six high rises over 100 metres. The biggest development proposal is the Waterloo Place which when completed in 2024, at  will become the tallest building in Salford, third-tallest in Greater Manchester and fourth-tallest in the United Kingdom outside London after the  Deansgate Square South Tower and the  Trinity Tower X, both in the adjacent Castlefield area of Manchester and the  100 Broad Street Tower in Birmingham.

Waterloo Place lies in close proximity to Anaconda Cut and will be joined by the three Greengate Park North towers, the tallest of which will reach . With the proposed  Gorton Street Tower and the under construction 112 metre Affinity Living Riverview and the  Irwell Towers, Greengate will soon have a coherent cluster of towers over 100 metres alongside a number of smaller towers.

If all future proposals come to fruition, Salford could contain 90 buildings over 50 metres tall as well as 13 high rises above 100 metres and three skyscrapers over 150 metres. When considered with Manchester city centre, which it borders, the area will contain 49 high rises over 100 metres, the highest in the United Kingdom outside London. If considered separately from Manchester, then at (13) Salford will contain the fourth highest number of high-rises of any city in the United Kingdom after Greater London (over 250), Manchester (44) and Birmingham (30).

Tallest buildings and structures
This list ranks externally complete buildings and free-standing structures in Salford, Greater Manchester that stand at least , based on standard height measurement. This includes spires and architectural details but does not include antenna masts.

An equals sign (=) following a rank indicates the same height between two or more buildings. The "Year" column indicates the year in which a building was completed. Buildings that have been demolished are not included.

Completed

Tallest buildings and structures

Under construction
This lists buildings that are under construction in Salford, Greater Manchester and are planned to rise at least . Under construction buildings that have already been topped out are listed above.

Approved
This lists buildings that are approved for construction in Salford, Greater Manchester and are planned to rise at least . If approved projects do not start construction within five years of their approval date they are assumed to be no longer active and considered 'unbuilt' unless further information is available.

Proposed
This lists buildings that are proposed for construction in Salford, Greater Manchester and are planned to rise at least . If proposed projects are not approved within five years of their proposal date they are assumed to be no longer active and considered 'unbuilt' unless further information is available.

Tallest buildings and structures

Unbuilt
This lists proposals for the construction of buildings in Salford, Greater Manchester that were planned to rise at least , for which planning permission was rejected or which were otherwise withdrawn.

Demolished
This lists buildings in Salford, Greater Manchester that were at least 50 metres (164 ft) and have since been demolished.

Tallest buildings and structures

Timeline of tallest buildings and structures
After a period after the 1960s building boom where few new significant buildings were built in Salford, Greater Manchester, the early 21st century has seen a long list of proposals meaning the skyline has been transformed in recent decades. Salford Cathedral was the tallest building in Salford for 118 years until City Central was completed in 1966. The first tower over 100 metres was Anaconda Cut.

Future tallest
This lists the top 20 buildings in order of height in Salford, Greater Manchester that are either completed, under construction, approved or proposed. The imminent transformation of the Salford skyline is made clear with only four of the top 20 already constructed, with three under construction, seven approved and six proposed.

See also

 List of tallest buildings and structures in Greater Manchester
 List of tallest buildings in the United Kingdom
 List of tallest buildings in Europe
 List of tallest buildings

References

Greater Manchester
Salford